Robertson Island is an ice-covered island,  long in a northwest-southeast direction and  wide, lying at the east end of the Seal Nunataks off the east coast of the Antarctic Peninsula. Captain Carl Anton Larsen discovered Robertson Island from the Jason on 9 December 1893. Curious to find out if the volcano was active he skied to the top from the north side of the island, later naming it Mt. Christensen after his longtime partner and majority owner of the Jason, Christen Christensen. Larsen named Robertson Island for William Robertson, co-owner of the Hamburg-based company Woltereck and Robertson.

San Roque Refuge 
San Roque Refuge  was an Argentine Antarctic refuge located on Robertson Island at the east end of the Foca nunataks off the Nordenskjöld coast east of the Antarctic Peninsula. The shelter was opened on 1 October 1956, and was administered by the Argentine Army. The refuge had been occupied and used in various operations and currently is inactive. It is one of the 18 shelters that are under the responsibility of the Esperanza Base, which is responsible for the maintenance and the care.

See also 
 Cape Marsh
 Composite Antarctic Gazetteer
 List of Antarctic and sub-Antarctic islands
 List of Antarctic field camps
 List of Antarctic islands south of 60° S
 SCAR
 Territorial claims in Antarctica

References

Sources

External links
 

Islands of Graham Land
Oscar II Coast